The Nishan-e-Pakistan is the highest civilian award of the Islamic Republic of Pakistan. It is awarded for "those who have rendered services of highest distinction" to the national interest of Pakistan. Nishan is awarded to government officials and civilians, including citizens of Pakistan and foreign nationals. In the Pakistan honours system, Nishan-e-Pakistan is equivalent to Nishan-e-Haider, the highest military gallantry award. Established on 19 March 1975 under the Decorations Act, 1975, the award is not correlated to the rank or status of a person.

This award, including other civilian awards, is announced on Independence Day (14 August) each year and its investiture takes place on the following Pakistan Resolution Day (23 March) by the president of Pakistan and, while it is the highest civilian award, it can also be awarded posthumously. Recipients are entitled to the post-nominal NPk.

Grades
 Grand Cross (Nishan)
 Grand Officer (Hilal)
 Commander (Sitara)
 Member (Tamgha)

Insignia
 Collar (Nishan)
 Sash (Nishan)
 Star (Nishan and Hilal)
 Badge (Nishan, Hilal, Sitara and Tamgha)
 Necklet/Bow (Hilal and Sitara)
 Medal (Nishan, Hilal, Sitara and Tamgha)

Nishan-e-Pakistan Gallery

Grand Crosses of the Order

See also

Nishan-e-Pakistan (Monument)
Nishan-e-Imtiaz
Civil decorations of Pakistan

References

External links

Decorations and Medals of Pakistan

Nishan-e-Pakistan
Civil awards and decorations of Pakistan
Awards established in 1957
1957 establishments in Pakistan